Hermann Ottomar Herzog (15 November 1831 – 6 February 1932) was a prominent nineteenth- and early twentieth-century European and American artist, primarily known for his landscapes. He is associated with the Düsseldorf school of painting. He almost always signed his work "H. Herzog"; as a result, his first name is spelled both "Herman" and "Hermann" in various sources.

Life and work
He was born in Bremen, Germany and entered the Düsseldorf Academy at age seventeen.   Herzog achieved early commercial success, allowing him to travel widely and continue his training. His patrons included royalty and nobility throughout Europe.

In the late 1860s, after an extensive trip to Norway, Herzog settled permanently near Philadelphia in the United States. Thereafter, he traveled throughout the U.S. and Mexico. He painted his way across the western states, arriving in California in 1873. His works from this trip included a series of Yosemite Valley paintings.  In 1876, he received an award at the Philadelphia Centennial Exhibition for his painting of Sentinel Rock in Yosemite. Herzog also made extensive trips to Maine and Florida to paint.

Because he was a prudent investor, Herzog did not have to depend on the sale of his artwork to maintain a comfortable lifestyle. Following his death, his family retained a large group of his paintings, most of which were released to the art market in the 1970s. A number of prominent American and European museums now include Herzog's work as part of their collections.

Herzog's work is sometimes considered to be part of the Hudson River School, although it is more realistic and less dramatic than works by peers Frederic Edwin Church or Albert Bierstadt.

The Brandywine River Museum in Chadds Ford, Pennsylvania held a major exhibition of Herzog's work in 1992 and published a catalog of his work, with an essay by art historian Donald S. Lewis, Jr.

In his long life, Herzog created more than 1,000 paintings, including "Women in a Tropical Setting" and "Landscape with a Bear and her Cub". He died in Philadelphia, aged one-hundred. His son, Lewis Edward, also became a landscape painter of some note.

See also
List of Hudson River School artists

Sources 

 "Herzog, Hermann", In: Hans Vollmer (Ed.): Allgemeines Lexikon der Bildenden Künstler von der Antike bis zur Gegenwart, Vol.16: Hansen–Heubach. E. A. Seemann, Leipzig 1923, pg.570
 Peter Hastings Falk: Who was Who in American Art. Sound View, Madison 1985, pg.279
 "Herzog, Hermann". In: Kunstmuseum Düsseldorf, Galerie Paffrath: Lexikon der Düsseldorfer Malerschule 1819–1918. Vol.2: Haach–Murtfeldt, F. Bruckmann, Munich 1998, pg.97 f.

External links

 More works by Herzog @ ArtNet
 Artwork by Hermann Ottomar Herzog

1831 births
1932 deaths
19th-century American painters
American male painters
20th-century American painters
American landscape painters
Hudson River School painters
19th-century German painters
19th-century American male artists
German male painters
20th-century American male artists
Kunstakademie Düsseldorf alumni
Düsseldorf school of painting